Music for 18 Musicians is a work of minimalist music composed by Steve Reich during 1974–1976. Its world premiere was on April 24, 1976, at The Town Hall in New York City. Following this, a recording of the piece was released by ECM New Series in 1978.

Composition 
In his introduction to the score, Reich mentions that although the piece is named Music for 18 Musicians, it is not necessarily advisable to perform the piece with that few players due to the extensive need for musicians to perform on multiple instruments.

The piece is based on a cycle of eleven chords. A small piece of music is based on each chord, and the piece returns to the original cycle at the end. The sections are named "Pulses", and Section I-XI. This was Reich's first attempt at writing for larger ensembles, and the extension of performers resulted in a growth of psychoacoustic effects, which fascinated Reich, and he noted that he would like to "explore this idea further". A prominent factor in this work is the augmentation of the harmonies and melodies and the way that they develop this piece. Another important factor in the piece is the use of human breath, used in the clarinets and voices, which help structure and bring a pulse to the piece. The player plays the pulsing note for as long as they can hold it, while each chord is melodically deconstructed by the ensemble, along with augmentation of the notes held. The metallophone (unplugged vibraphone), is used to cue the ensemble to change patterns or sections.

Some sections of the piece have a chiastic ABCDCBA structure, and Reich noted that this one work contained more harmonic movement in the first five minutes than any other work he had previously written.

Reception 
In a review of the 1978 release, AllMusic wrote that "when this recording was released in 1978, the impact on the new music scene was immediate and overwhelming. Anyone who saw potential in minimalism and had hoped for a major breakthrough piece found it here. The beauty of its pulsing added-note harmonies and the sustained power and precision of the performance were the music's salient features; and instead of the sterile, electronic sound usually associated with minimalism, the music's warm resonance was a welcome change." Reviewing the 1978 LP in Christgau's Record Guide: Rock Albums of the Seventies (1981), Robert Christgau wrote of Music for 18 Musicians: "In which pulsing modules of high-register acoustic sound—the ensemble comprises violin, cello, clarinet, piano, marimbas, xylophone, metallophone, and women's voices—evolve harmonically toward themselves. Very mathematical, yet also very, well, organic—the duration of particular note-pulses is determined by the natural breath rhythms of the musicians—this sounds great in the evening near the sea." Critic Edward Strickland argues that Music for 18 Musicians is "the high point of ensemble music of the 1970s by composers identified as Minimalist". Ottó Károlyi identifies diverse influences including jazz and Balinese musical forms and notes that the piece's vocals feature organum and conductus.

In 2003, David Bowie included it in a list of 25 of his favourite albums, "Confessions of a Vinyl Junkie", calling it "Balinese gamelan music cross-dressing as minimalism".

Recordings 

There have been many performances of the piece, and several commercial recordings:
 The original ECM version played by Steve Reich and Musicians (1978)
 The Nonesuch version, played by Reich and musicians along with new musicians, a new recording of which is included on Steve Reich: Works 1965-1995 (1997/2015)
 The Ensemble Modern version (1999)
 The Amadinda Percussion Group version, a live concert recording (2003)
 The Grand Valley State University New Music Ensemble version (2007)
 This 2007 Innova release, the first recorded in surround sound, has received critical praise, including from Steve Reich.
 'Music for 18 Musicians (Rough Fields Overdubbed Version)' by Rough Fields (solo)
 The Harmonia Mundi version, played by Ensemble Signal. (2015)
 The Erik Hall solo version (2020)

The version on Works 1965–1995 lasts just over an hour.

Structure
With only 18 musicians, the parts are divided as follows:

 Violin
 Cello
 Female voice
 Female voice
 Female voice
 Piano
 Piano
 Piano and maracas
 Marimba and maracas
 Marimba and xylophone
 Marimba and xylophone
 Marimba and xylophone
 Metallophone and piano
 Piano and marimba
 Marimba, xylophone, and piano
 Clarinet and bass clarinet
 Clarinet and bass clarinet
 Female voice and piano

Remixes 
The remix album Reich Remixed includes an interpretation of Music for 18 Musicians by the British duo Coldcut.

References

External links
 SteveReich.com MP3 of the opening through section II available under Multimedia: MP3
 Boosey&Hawkes entry (includes composer's notes)
 Lowlands 2013 Performance by Steve Reich & Ensemble

Compositions by Steve Reich
1976 compositions
ECM New Series albums
1978 albums